(born September 11, 1976) is a Japanese softball player who played as a catcher. She won the silver medal for Japan in the 2000 Summer Olympics.

References

Japanese softball players
Softball players at the 2000 Summer Olympics
Olympic softball players of Japan
Olympic silver medalists for Japan
Living people
1976 births
Olympic medalists in softball
Place of birth missing (living people)
Asian Games medalists in softball
Softball players at the 1998 Asian Games
Medalists at the 1998 Asian Games
Asian Games silver medalists for Japan
Medalists at the 2000 Summer Olympics
20th-century Japanese women